Rosemary Hayes (born 10 December 1942) is a British author who has written around 50 books for children aimed at ages from seven years to teenagers. She has edited many more. She worked for Cambridge University Press and then set up her own publishing house, Anglia Young Books.

Early life and education
Hayes was born and brought up in rural Berkshire.  She read avidly as a child and was particularly influenced by the books of Elizabeth Goudge and the Chronicles of Narnia by C. S. Lewis.

Hayes attended Brightwalton Primary School from 1947-50 then St Gabriel’s, Sandleford Priory in Newbury.  In 1970, she enrolled in a Creative Writing Course at Monash University, Melbourne, Australia.

Career 
Hayes came to writing from a background in advertising, marketing and publishing. She worked intermittently for Cambridge University Press from 1986-2001 and one of her jobs was to run a national children’s writing competition, The Cambridge Young Writers’ Award, which attracted thousands of entries.  In  1989, she launched her own publishing company, Anglia Young Books, producing curriculum-related historical fiction for primary schools. She sold the company to Mill Publishing in 2000 but continued to commission books for the new owners for several years.
She has written more than 45 books for children and is working on more. Her first novel, ‘Race Against Time’ (set in Australia) was runner up for the Kathleen Fidler Award in 1988. Many of Hayes’ other books have been shortlisted for awards. Details are on her author website. Hayes teaches Creative Writing at an adult learning centre in Letchworth and runs creative writing workshops in various schools in England.

Hayes is an active member of Walden Writers and within this she set up a critique group with other published authors including Penny Speller, Amy Corzine, Victor Watson author and Jane Wilson-Howarth. She is also a member of the Society of Authors  East Anglian Writers and The Scattered Authors’ Society

She has lived and worked in France, USA and Australia and has traveled widely in Europe, the Middle and Far East. Her researches for Forgotten Footprints and The Blue-eyed Aborigine took her to the Netherlands and the Shipwreck Museum in Freemantle. Hayes has frequently been interviewed on local radio (BBC Radio Cambridgeshire, BBC Radio Essex, BBC Radio Suffolk) and in the press (Cambridge News and Eastern Daily Press).

Books

References

External links 
 Rosemary Hayes author website

Living people
1942 births
British women writers
People from Newbury, Berkshire
People from Brightwalton
English children's writers